may refer to:

Ishibashi (surname)
Ishibashi, Tochigi, a town located in Shimotsuga District, Tochigi Prefecture, Japan
Ishibashi handai-mae Station, formerly Ishibashi Station, a train station located in Ikeda, Osaka Prefecture, Japan
Ishibashi Park is a park in Hama-machi, Kagoshima, Japan
Ishibashi Station (Tochigi), a train station located in Ishibashi, Tochigi, Japan
Minakuchi Ishibashi Station, a passenger railway station in located in the Japanese city of Kōka